Tim Lo Duca (born 17 December 1985) is a retired Slovenian footballer who played as a forward.

Career
Lo Duca began his senior career with Primorje in 2003. In February 2006, he was signed by Domžale. From January to June 2008, Lo Duca was loaned to Livar. In July 2009, he signed a contract with Rudar Velenje.

References

External links
Player profile at NZS 
Player profile at Austrian Football Association 

1985 births
Living people
People from Tolmin
Slovenian footballers
Association football forwards
Slovenian PrvaLiga players
Slovenian Second League players
NK Primorje players
NK Domžale players
NK Ivančna Gorica players
NK Nafta Lendava players
NK Rudar Velenje players
Slovenian expatriate footballers
Slovenian expatriate sportspeople in Austria
Expatriate footballers in Austria
Slovenia youth international footballers
Slovenia under-21 international footballers